The 1928 season was the Hawthorn Football Club's 4th season in the Victorian Football League and 27th overall.

Fixture

Premiership Season

Ladder

References

Hawthorn Football Club seasons